The following is a list of Singaporean Community Development Councils from 2001 to 2006.

On 24 November 2001, the nine Community Development Councils that were created in 1997 were reduced to five. The five CDCs have remained unchanged since then except for their constituencies which change following a general election.

References 

 Community Development Council
2001 establishments in Singapore